Lucky Golden Stripes and Starpose is the sixth studio album by Wigwam, released in April 1976. The album was recorded at Virgin Records’ The Manor in Oxfordshire in January 1976 with Scottish musician Ronnie Leahy in the producer's chair. The album had a double release by Love Records in Finland and Virgin internationally. The track listings were identical but the releases had different artwork.

Lucky Golden Stripes And Starpose continued the theme of the previous album, Nuclear Nightclub, in having a pop-rock style. There were, however, still prog-rock elements to the album, and the track "Colossus" is a stand-out piece of classic '70s prog-rock. The album strangely did not include the single "Tramdriver/Wardance", which had been released the previous year. Hopes that it would be added came to pass in 2010 when the whole album including these tracks was re-mastered and re-released on Esoteric Recordings. The album was recorded at the Virgin Manor (UK), January 1976, except "Tramdriver" recorded at Manor Mobile and Kingsway Studio August 1975 and "Wardance" recorded at Marcus Music Studio, Stockholm November 1975.

Artwork
As noted above, there were two versions of artwork. The Finnish release had artwork by former Wigwam bassist Mats Huldén. This depicted a group of US 19th century Cavalry soldiers on horses and with weapons depicting the Middle Ages. Wigwam were hoping to break into the US market and this hope is more clearly signalled on the international release. The cover design by Clive Arrowsmith shows headshots of the band within the US flag.

Reception
The album has received mixed reviews. This reflects the band's continued move away from their prog-rock roots. The album was considered not as good as its predecessor, Nuclear Nightclub, and to be of varied quality, with some songs poorly arranged. Some tracks, such as the title track and "Colossus", are highly regarded.

Track listing

Personnel
The line-up was identical to the previous album apart from the replacement of Esa Kotilainen with Hessu Hietanen on keyboards.

 Mosse Groundstroem – bass
 Hessu Hietanen – keyboards
 Ronnie Österberg – drums, percussion 
 Jim Pembroke – vocals, piano 
 Pekka Rechardt – guitar 
 Paavo Maijanen – backing vocals

Production
 Engineer – John Eden  
 Mastered By – Ben Wiseman  
 Producer – Paavo Maijanen (track 10), Ronnie Leahy (tracks 1 to 9, 11)  
 Recorded By – Paavo Maijanen  
 Remastered By – Pauli Saastamoinen

References

Wigwam (Finnish band) albums
1976 albums
Love Records albums
Virgin Records albums